Marc Lazar (b. 1952. Paris) is a french academic who serves as a professor and director of the Doctoral School at the Paris Institute of Political Studies (better known as Sciences Po). He is also the President of the LUISS school of government in Rome. He manages a research group on contemporary Italy with CERI (Centre de recherches internationales). He is a specialist of the History of left-wing parties, and Italian politics. He graduated from the School for Advanced Studies in Social Sciences (EHESS).

Career 
As an "Associate of History", Marc Lazar taught in public schools for public schools.

After completing his Ph.D in History, he has been Jean Monnet fellow at the European University Institute as member of the department of History and of the department of Political science. He has been researcher at the CNRS, in Political science at the CACSP (Centre d'Analyse Comparative des Systèmes Politiques), University of Paris I (1987-1989), "Lecturer" in political science at the University of Paris I (1989-1993), "Lecturer" at Sciences Po (1990-1999), Associate Professor at Stanford University, Program Stanford in Paris (1994-2005).

After his HDR, he has been Professor of Political sociology (1993-1999) at University Paris X then Professor of Political History and Sociology at Sciences Po since 1999. He has been visiting professor at Luiss-Guido Carli University in Rome (2007-2014).

External links 
Published works 

1952 births
Living people
Sciences Po alumni
Date of birth missing (living people)